Khan Tehsil (  2016) was a Pakistani folk singer of Pashto language.

Biography 
He was born around 1931 in Nowshera, Khyber Pakhtunkhwa, Pakistan. He lived a nomadic life throughout his life shifting from one place to another. He spent most of his life between Timergara and Nowshera.

He started his career as a wedding singer from his hometown Lakki Marwat with Zarsanga. He sung around four hundred uncertain albums including  at Radio Pakistan, Peshawar. He was introduced to radio by a music producer, Rashid Ali Dehqaan Dawar and director Mahmoob Ali Khan.

Personal life 
He suffered financial crises in his last days and later, Mian Iftikhar Hussain gave him PKR100,000 after he requested the government for assistance.

Death 
He was suffering from multiple health complications several years before his died at his home in March 2016. He is buried in a cemetery near Risalpur area of Nowshera.

References 

1930s births
2016 deaths
Pakistani folk singers
Musicians from Khyber Pakhtunkhwa
20th-century Pakistani male singers
Recipients of the Pride of Performance